Khanim Balajayeva (born March 28, 2001) is an Azerbaijani chess player. She was awarded the title Woman Grandmaster by FIDE in 2019.

Career 
In February 2018, Balajayeva won the Azerbaijani women's championship edging out Gunay Mammadzada on tie-break score. Both players scored  6½ points out of 9.

Team competitions
At the 42nd Chess Olympiad, which was held in Baku, Azerbaijan, in September 2016, on the rights of the hosts of the tournament, Azerbaijan was represented by three teams. Balajayeva  played on board two of the 3rd Azerbaijani team in the women's section. The team finished the tournament on 30th place, while Balajayeva scored 7½ points out of 11 games.

She played on the Azerbaijani team again at the Women's World Team Chess Championship in 2017 in Khanty-Mansiysk, Russia.

At the 43rd Chess Olympiad, which took place in Batumi, Georgia in September–October 2018, Balajayeva  represented Azerbaijan in the women's event playing board three and scored 7 points out of 9. Her performance rating was 2522, which earned her the gold medal on board 3. The team finished the tournament on the 10th place.

References

External links 

Khanim Balajayeva chess games at 365Chess.com
Khanim Balajayeva team chess record at Olimpbase.org

2001 births
Living people
Azerbaijani female chess players
Chess woman grandmasters
Chess Olympiad competitors
People from Qakh